West By Sea is an armchair treasure hunt book in the form of a travel journal. It was written by Michelle M. B. Beale, designed by Edward K. Beale, and published in February 2016. It contains concealed clues to the location of a hidden object.

Summary
West By Sea is a travelogue written by a brain cancer survivor about 105 days spent circumnavigating the globe by ship. Each page describes one day of the journey, and includes two photographs, the daily position and weather, and a quote. Written in first person present tense, the story is a chronological narrative account. The narrative about the voyage includes stops at 40 ports in 28 countries on 6 continents, starting and ending in Sydney, Australia.

Major ports in chronological order include:
 Day 1: Sydney, Australia
 Day 3: Brisbane, Australia
 Day 12: Singapore
 Day 13: Kuala Lumpur, Malaysia
 Day 14: Langkawi, Malaysia
 Day 19: Mumbai, India
 Day 20: Agra, India
 Day 21: New Delhi, India
 Day 22: Dubai, United Arab Emirates
 Day 28: Luxor, Egypt
 Day 29: Petra, Jordan
 Day 31: Suez Canal transit
 Day 32: Masada, Israel, Dead Sea
 Day 34: Athens, Greece
 Day 35: Mytilene, Greece
 Day 36: Istanbul, Turkey
 Day 37: Anzac Cove
 Day 39: Naples, Italy and Pompeii
 Day 40: Rome, Italy and Vatican City
 Day 41: Pisa and Florence, Italy
 Day 42: Monte Carlo, Monaco
 Day 43: Barcelona, Spain
 Day 45: Seville, Spain
 Day 46: Lisbon, Portugal
 Day 49: Cobh, Ireland
 Day 50: Dublin, Ireland
 Day 51: Glasgow, Scotland, United Kingdom
 Day 53: Le Havre, France
 Day 54: Dover, England
 Day 55: Amsterdam, Netherlands
 Day 57: Copenhagen, Denmark
 Day 58: Oslo, Norway
 Day 60: Torshavn, Faroe Islands
 Day 67: New York City, United States
 Day 72: Oranjestad, Aruba
 Day 73: Willemstad, Curacao
 Day 75: Panama Canal transit
 Day 77: Puntarenas, Costa Rica
 Day 83: Los Angeles, United States
 Day 88: Hilo, Hawaiian Islands
 Day 89: Honolulu, Hawaiian Islands
 Day 90: Nawiliwili, Hawaiian Islands
 Day 96: Pago Pago, American Samoa
 Day 98: Suva, Fiji
 Day 101: Auckland, New Zealand
 Day 102: Bay of Islands, New Zealand
 Day 105: Sydney, Australia

Prerelease development
The book started as a project on Kickstarter to help maintain a blog via satellite from the ship. The campaign generated over $10,000US from 153 backers on four continents.

Awards and recognition
 Finalist, Best Interior Design - USA Best Books Awards, 4 December 2016
 First Place, Travel category - Reader Views Literary Awards 2016-2017, 10 March 2017
 Finalist, Travel category - 2016 Foreword INDIES Awards, 15 March 2017
 Nominee, Travel and Memoir categories - 2017 Independent Publisher IPPY Award, 1 April 2017

Select bibliography
Michelle Beale, West By Sea, Mystic: Expeditionaire, 2016

See also
 Masquerade, a 1979 children's book by Kit Williams that sparked a worldwide treasure hunt
 The Merlin Mystery, a treasure hunt book from 1998
 Treasure: In Search of the Golden Horse

Notes and references

External links
 Project website and blog
 Kickstarter campaign for the book project

2016 books
American travel books
Travelogues
American memoirs
Puzzle hunts
Puzzle books